Jennifer Burney grew up in Albuquerque, New Mexico and is now Professor and the Marshall Saunders Chancellor's Endowed Chair in Global Climate Policy and Research at the University of California, San Diego, as part of the School of Global Policy and Strategy. She studied history and science at Harvard University and earned a PhD in physics from Stanford, developing a superconducting camera to capture images of cosmic bodies, like pulsars or exoplanets. After graduating, she worked for Solar Electric Light Fund on rural electrification, particularly in West Africa. 

She worked as a postdoc, starting in 2008, at Stanford on food security and the environment. She was named a National Geographic Emerging Explorer in 2011. As a current research affiliate at the University of California, San Diego's Policy Design and Evaluation Laboratory, her research focuses mainly on global food security, adaptation, and climate change mitigation. Some projects she has worked on include rural electrification, aerosol emissions, and high-yield farming.

Her partner is Claire Adida, Professor of Political Science at the University of California, San Diego. They have two children.

References

External links 

21st-century American women scientists
Living people
21st-century American physicists
Year of birth missing (living people)
LGBT people from California
Environmental scientists
Stanford University alumni
University of California, San Diego faculty
LGBT academics
American LGBT scientists
Harvard College alumni